Johann Saathoff (born 9 December 1967) is a German politician of the Social Democratic Party (SPD) who has been serving as Parliamentary State Secretary in the Federal Ministry of the Interior and Community in the coalition government of Chancellor Olaf Scholz since 2021. He has been serving as a member of the Bundestag from the state of Lower Saxony since 2013.

From 2020 until 2021, Saathoff served as the German government's Coordinator for Inter-Societal Cooperation with Russia, Central Asia and the Eastern Partnership Countries at the Federal Foreign Office in the coalition government of Chancellor Angela Merkel.

Political career 
Saathoff became a member of the Bundestag in the 2013 German federal election. From 2013 until 2021, he was a member of the Committee for Food and Agriculture and the Committee for Economic Affairs and Energy.

In addition to his committee assignments, Saathoff is part of the German Parliamentary Friendship Group for Relations with the ASEAN States.

In the negotiations to form a so-called traffic light coalition of the SPD, the Green Party and the Free Democratic Party (FDP) following the 2021 federal elections, Saathoff was part of his party's delegation in the working group on economic affairs, co-chaired by Carsten Schneider, Cem Özdemir and Michael Theurer.

Other activities 
 Business Forum of the Social Democratic Party of Germany, Member of the Political Advisory Board (since 2018)
 , Member of the Board (since 2020)
 Federal Network Agency for Electricity, Gas, Telecommunications, Post and Railway (BNetzA), Member of the Advisory Board (since 2015)
 Agora Energiewende, Member of the Council 
 German United Services Trade Union (ver.di), Member

References

External links 
 
  
 Bundestag biography 

1967 births
Living people
Members of the Bundestag for Lower Saxony
Members of the Bundestag 2017–2021
Members of the Bundestag 2013–2017
Members of the Bundestag for the Social Democratic Party of Germany
Members of the Bundestag 2021–2025